Boeddicker is a crater in the Aeolis quadrangle of Mars, located at 15° south latitude and 197.7° west longitude.  It is 109 km in diameter and was named after Otto Boeddicker, a German astronomer (1853–1937).

Boeddicker Crater was discussed as a landing site for the 2003 Mars Exploration Rovers.  It was one of 25 from a list of 185 after the FirstLanding Site Workshop for the 2003 Mars Exploration Rovers, January 24–25, 2001, at NASA Ames Research Center.

Boeddicker Crater has a uniformly sloped crater floor which tracks with a gradational albedo change, similar to Gusev crater to the east. Some researchers have hypothesized that this could be the result of aeolian deposition.

See also
 Groundwater on Mars
 Geology of Mars
 HiRISE
 Impact crater
 Impact event
 List of craters on Mars
 Ore resources on Mars
 Planetary nomenclature

References 

Aeolis quadrangle
Impact craters on Mars